Major League Baseball on DuMont refers to the now defunct DuMont Television Network's coverage of Major League Baseball. More specifically, DuMont broadcast the World Series (during its very early years as a televised event) from 1947-1949.

World Series coverage

Gillette, which produced World Series telecasts from roughly 1947-1965 (before 1966, local announcers, who were chosen by the Gillette Company, the Commissioner of Baseball, and NBC television, exclusively called the World Series), paid for airtime on DuMont's owned-and-operated Pittsburgh affiliate, WDTV (now KDKA-TV) to air the World Series. In the meantime, Gillette also bought airtime on ABC, CBS, and NBC. More to the point, in some cities, the World Series was broadcast on three different stations at once. For example, the 1947 World Series (for which DuMont only televised Games 2, 6–7 with Bill Slater on the call) was only seen in four markets via coaxial inter-connected stations: New York City, New York; Philadelphia, Pennsylvania; Schenectady, New York; Washington, District of Columbia; and, environs surrounding these cities. Outside of New York, coverage was pooled.

For the  World Series, games in Boston were only seen in the Northeast. Meanwhile, games in Cleveland were only seen in the Midwest and Pittsburgh. The games were open to all channels with a network affiliation. In all, the 1948 World Series was televised to fans in seven Midwestern cities: Cleveland, Chicago, Detroit, Milwaukee, St. Louis, and Toledo. By , World Series games could now be seen east of the Mississippi River. The games were open to all channels with a network affiliation.

Attempts at creating a regular season national package
By the start of the 1950s, Major League Baseball was, for the most part, still in the province of the local market television stations. Outside of these markets, however, televised baseball (unlike on radio) was rare. DuMont's sports programming head, Thomas McMahon was working with individual owners to televise Major League Baseball's first regular season national games in the summer of 1953.

McMahon planned (as far back as January 1953) to set up a corporation to sell the national MLB telecasts meanwhile, giving stock shares to minor league teams. More specifically, McMahon's plan was to negotiate with individual teams rather than Major League Baseball as a whole. This way, McMahon could avoid a potential antitrust suit from the Department of Justice. In order to counter the possible negative effect on the minors (which Western League president Edwin C. Johnson most predominately feared), McMahon would offer them a piece of the national television pie. Furthermore, McMahan argued that since the planned DuMont games would be held on Saturday afternoons, the minors that scheduled most of their games in the evening wouldn't have been greatly affected.

Ultimately, however, the first national Game of the Week package didn't air on DuMont, but on ABC. In April 1953, ABC set out to sell teams rights but instead, only got the Philadelphia Athletics, Cleveland Indians, and Chicago White Sox to sign on. To make matters worse, Major League Baseball barred the Game of the Week from airing within 50 miles of any ballpark.

Major League Baseball on DuMont's affiliates

DuMont's owned-and-operated stations are highlighted in yellow. The Paramount owned-and-operated stations, which did not carry DuMont programs but were ruled DuMont O&Os by the FCC, are shown in pink. Franchises that were later relocated are listed in italics.

American League

National League

References

External links
Searchable Network TV Broadcasts

DuMont
1947 American television series debuts
1949 American television series endings
DuMont sports programming